University of Muhammadiyah Aceh (Indonesian: Universitas Muhammadiyah Aceh, UNMUHA) is a private university under the auspices of the Muhammadiyah College located in Banda Aceh City, Aceh, Indonesia.

Faculties 
The university has seven faculties and a graduate program:

     Faculty of Islamic Religion
     Faculty of Economics
     Faculty of Law
     Faculty of Public Health
     Faculty of Psychology
     Faculty of Engineering
     Faculty of Vocational
     Graduate program

References 

Banda Aceh
Universities in Aceh